Susanna Haavisto (born 20 October 1957, in Helsinki) is a Finnish actress and singer. She is the daughter of musician Jukka Haavisto and sister of musicians Olli and Janne Haavisto.

She has taken part in several movies and TV programs. She was UNICEF National Ambassador in 1980.

Filmography 
Arctic Circle (TV series, 2018)
Kymmenen riivinrautaa (2002)
Ripa ruostuu (1993)
Mestari (1992)
Vääpeli Körmy ja marsalkan sauva (1990)
Ariel (1988)
Kuningas lähtee Ranskaan (1986)
Aidankaatajat eli heidän jälkeensä vedenpaisumus (1982)
Läpimurto (1981)
Prologi (1980)

References

External links

  Haavisto EMI:n sivuilla

1957 births
Living people
Singers from Helsinki
Actresses from Helsinki
20th-century Finnish women singers
UNICEF Goodwill Ambassadors